Anders Yrfeldt (born 11 April 1938) is a Danish former footballer and football manager.

Career 
Yrfeldt played in the Danish 1st Division in 1956 with Boldklubben af 1893. In 1961, he played abroad in Switzerland in the Nationalliga A with FC Lugano. In 1963, he played in the Eastern Canada Professional Soccer League with Toronto Italia. He was selected to the Toronto All-Star team that faced a Greek All-Star team, which consisted of players from various Greek clubs. In his debut season he assisted in securing the double (regular and playoff championship) for Toronto. The following season he extended his contract for another three seasons. He would contribute to another playoff championship in 1965, and an additional regular season title in 1966.

In 1967, he played in the American Soccer League with the Rochester Lancers. For the remainder of the 1967 season he played in the National Soccer League with Toronto Inter-Roma. The following season he was transferred to Sudbury Italia, where he assisted in securing the NSL Championship. In 1969, he returned to Toronto Italia, where he served as a player-coach. In 1970, he saw action with the Serbian White Eagles FC, and in 1971 with the Toronto First Portuguese. In 1972, he played in the Toronto and District League with Toronto San Fili.

Managerial career 
In 1969, he served as a player-coach for Toronto Italia in the National Soccer League, where he secured the National League Cup after defeating Toronto Hungaria. In the indoor season he managed the Toronto Italians in the International Indoor Soccer League in 1969. In 1972, he served once more in the capacity of a player-coach with Toronto San Fili in the Toronto and District League, where he reached the finals of the Challenge Trophy. The following season he led San Fili to the Ontario Cup finals, but were defeated by Toronto West Indies United.

In 1973, he was named the general manager for the Toronto Indoor Soccer League. In 1981, he was the general manager for Toronto Italia, and in 1984 served as the sports director for Toronto.

Honours

Player
Sudbury Italia 
NSL Championship: 1968

Manager
Toronto Italia 
National League Cup: 1969

Toronto San Fili
Ontario Cup: 1972

References 

Living people
1938 births
Danish men's footballers
Association football forwards
Boldklubben af 1893 players
FC Lugano players
Toronto Italia players
Toronto First Portuguese players
Toronto Roma players
Serbian White Eagles FC players
Danish 1st Division players
Swiss Super League players
Eastern Canada Professional Soccer League players
Canadian National Soccer League players
Danish football managers
Canadian National Soccer League coaches
American Soccer League (1933–1983) players
Rochester Lancers (1967–1980) players
Danish expatriate men's footballers
Danish expatriate sportspeople in Canada
Expatriate soccer players in Canada
Danish expatriate sportspeople in Switzerland
Expatriate footballers in Switzerland
Footballers from Copenhagen